Please add names of notable painters with a Wikipedia page, in precise English alphabetical order, using U.S. spelling conventions. Country and regional names refer to where painters worked for long periods, not to personal allegiances.

Bogi Fabian (born 1984), Hungarian/Italian painter
Barent Fabritius (1624–1673), Dutch painter
Carel Fabritius (1622–1654), Dutch painter
Johannes Fabritius (1636–1693), Dutch still-life painter
Pietro Faccini (1562–1602), Italian painter
Caesar Andrade Faini (1913–1995), Ecuadorian painter and teacher
Frances C. Fairman (1839–1923), English painter and illustrator
Ian Fairweather (1891–1974), Scottish/Australian painter
Leila Faithfull (1896–1994), English wartime and portrait painter
Julian Fałat (1853–1929), Polish watercolor painter
Aniello Falcone (1600–1665), Italian battle-scene painter
Luis Ricardo Falero (1851–1896), Spanish painter
Alexandre Falguière (1831–1900), French sculptor and painter
Hans Falk (1918–2002), Swiss/Italian painter, poster artist and graphic designer
Robert Falk (1886–1958), Russian painter
Claire Falkenstein (1908–1997), American sculptor and painter
Fernando Amorsolo (1892–1972), Philippines painter and portraitist
Fan Kuan (范寬, 990–1030), Chinese landscape painter
Fan Qi, (樊圻, 1616–1694), Chinese landscape painter
Fang Congyi (方從義, 1302–1393) Chinese painter
Farid Mansour (1929–2010), Lebanese painter and sculptor
Henri Fantin-Latour (1836–1904), French painter and lithographer
Dennis H. Farber (born 1946), American painter and photographer
Demetrios Farmakopoulos (1919–1996), Greek painter
Mahmoud Farshchian (born 1930), Persian painter and miniaturist
Bernd Fasching (born 1955), Austrian painter and sculptor
Giovanni Fattori (1825–1905), Italian artist and etcher
Jean Fautrier (1898–1964), French painter, printmaker and sculptor
Daphne Fedarb (1912–1992), English painter
Helmut Federle (born 1944), Swiss painter
Franz Fedier (1922–2005), Swiss painter
Pavel Fedotov (1815–1852), Russian painter
Paul Feeley (1910–1966), American artist and art director
Fei Danxu (費丹旭, 1801–1850), Chinese painter
Hermann Feierabend (1925–1995), Swiss painter
Lyonel Feininger (1871–1956), American painter, caricaturist and comic-strip artist
Robert Feke (1707–1752), American portrait painter
Adolf Fényes (1867–1945), Hungarian artist
Béni Ferenczy (1890–1967), Hungarian sculptor and graphic artist
Károly Ferenczy (1862–1917), Hungarian painter
Noémi Ferenczy (1890–1957), Hungarian tapestry designer and weaver
Amos Ferguson (1920–2009), Bahamian folk artist
William Gouw Ferguson (1632/1633 – c. 1689), Scottish/French painter
Christian Jane Fergusson (1876–1957), Scottish painter
John Duncan Fergusson (1874–1961), Scottish painter and sculptor
Elsie Few (1909–1980), Jamaican/English painter and collage artist
Anna Findlay (1885–1968), Scottish linocut and woodcut printmaker
Celia Fiennes (1902–1998), English printmaker and illustrator
Pedro Figari (1861–1938), Uruguayan painter, lawyer and politician
Francesco Filippini (1853–1895), Italian painter
Pavel Filonov (1883–1941), Russian painter, art theorist and poet
Willy Finch (1854–1930). Belgian ceramicist and painter
Perle Fine (1905–1988) American artist
Leonor Fini (1908–1996), Argentine painter, illustrator and author
Ian Hamilton Finlay (1925–2006), Scottish artist, writer and gardener
Hans Fischer (1909–1958), Swiss painter
Paul Gustave Fischer (1860–1934), Danish painter
Janet Fish (born 1938), American artist
Alvan Fisher (1792–1863), American landscape and genre painter
Hugo Anton Fisher (1854–1916), Austro-Hungarian (Czech)/American landscape painter
James Montgomery Flagg (1877–1960), American artist and illustrator
Dennis Flanders (1915–1994), English painter and draftsman
Juan de Flandes (1460–1519), Flemish/Spanish painter
Bernard Fleetwood-Walker (1893–1965), English artist
Govert Flinck (1615–1660), Dutch painter
Sir William Russell Flint (1880–1969), Scottish painter and illustrator
Cornelia MacIntyre Foley (1909–2010), American painter
John Fulton Folinsbee (1892–1972), American painter
Lucio Fontana (1899–1968), Argentinian painter, sculptor and theorist
Victorine Foot (1920–2000), English painter and military camouflage artist
Elizabeth Forbes (1859–1912), Canadian/English painter
Stanhope Forbes (1857–1947), English artist
Laura Ford (born 1961), English painter
Michael Ford (1920–2005), English artist and illustrator
Mollie Forestier-Walker (1912–1990), English portrait painter
Melozzo da Forlì (ca. 1438–1494), Italian fresco painter
William Forsyth (1854–1935), American painter
Graham Forsythe (living), Northern Irish/Canadian painter
E. Charlton Fortune (1885–1969), American painter
Marià Fortuny (1838–1874), Spanish (Catalan) painter
Johanna Marie Fosie (1726–1764), Danish painter
Tsuguharu Foujita (藤田嗣治, 1886–1968), Japanese/French painter and print-maker
Cherryl Fountain (born 1950), English still life, landscape and botanical artist
Jean Fouquet (1425–1481), French panel painter, manuscript illuminator and portrait miniaturist
Alexandre-Évariste Fragonard (1780–1850), French painter and sculptor
Jean-Honoré Fragonard (1732–1806), French painter and printmaker
Art Frahm (1907–1981), American painter
Piero della Francesca (c. 1415 – 1492), Italian artist
François Louis Thomas Francia (1772–1839), French painter
John F. Francis (1808–1886), American still life painter
Sam Francis (1923–1994), American painter and printmaker
Hannah Frank (1908–2008), Scottish artist and sculptor
Jane Frank (1918–1986), American painter, sculptor and mixed-media artist
Helen Frankenthaler (1928–2011), American abstract expressionist painter
Eva Frankfurther (1930–1959), English artist 
Manuel Franquelo (born c. 1950), Spanish painter and mixed-media sculptor
Frank Frazetta (born 1928), American artist and poster painter
Wilhelm Freddie (1909–1995), Danish painter, sculptor and film-maker
Robert Freebairn (1765–1808), Scottish/English painter
Jane Freeman (1871–1963), English/American painter and art teacher
Jane Freilicher (1924–2014), American painter
Charles Alphonse du Fresnoy (1611–1665), French painter and writer
Lucian Freud (1922–2011), English figurative painter
Sigmund Freudenberger (1745–1801), Swiss painter
Friedrich Ritter von Friedländer-Malheim (1825–1901), Austro-Hungarian (Bohemian) painter
Caspar David Friedrich (1774–1840), German landscape painter
Hans Fries (1465–1523), Swiss painter
Pia Fries (born 1955), Swiss painter
Frederick Carl Frieseke (1874–1939), American/French painter, illustrator and etcher
Lorentz Frölich (1820–1908), Danish painter, illustrator and etcher
Otto Frölicher (1840–1890), Swiss landscape painter
Nicolas Froment (1450–1490), French religious painter
Brian Froud (born 1947), English fantasy illustrator
Fu Baoshi (傅抱石, 1904–1965), Chinese painter and art researcher
Emil Fuchs (1866–1929) Austrian/American sculptor, painter and author
Nick Fudge (born 1960), British painter, sculptor and digital artist
Fujishima Takeji (藤島武二, 1867–1943), Japanese painter
Fujiwara Nobuzane (藤原信実, 1176–1265), Japanese portrait painter
Fujiwara Takanobu (藤原隆信, 1142–1205), Japanese portrait painter
Francesco Furini (c. 1600 or 1603–1646), Italian painter
Wilhelmina Weber Furlong (1878–1962), American modernist painter
Thomas Furlong (1886–1952), American muralist and portrait painter
Ludovit Fulla (1902–1980), Slovak painter, graphic artist and teacher
Violet Fuller (1920–2006), English painter 
Joseph von Führich (1800–1876), Austrian painter
John Russell Fulton (1896–1979), American painter and illustrator
Charles Furneaux (1835–1913), American painter and art teacher
Henry Fuseli (1741–1825), Swiss/English painter, draftsman and writer on art
Anna Füssli (1749–1772), Swiss painter
Johann Caspar Füssli (1706–1782), Swiss portrait painter and writer
Johann Kaspar Füssli (1743–1786), Swiss painter and entomologist

References
References can be found under each entry.

F